Akbulatovo (Aqbulat) is a rural locality (a selo) in Fyodorovsky Selsoviet, Fyodorovsky District, Bashkortostan, Russia. The population was 308 as of 2010. There are 3 streets.

Geography 
Akbulatovo is located 6 km southwest of Fyodorovka (the district's administrative centre) by road. Nikolayevka is the nearest rural locality.

References 

Rural localities in Fyodorovsky District